Heriberto "Herito" Rodríguez Adorno (born September 24, 1973) is a Puerto Rican politician and former mayor of Morovis. Avilés is affiliated with the New Progressive Party (PNP) and he served as mayor from 2001 to 2017.

References

Living people
1973 births
Mayors of places in Puerto Rico
People from Bayamón, Puerto Rico
New Progressive Party (Puerto Rico) politicians
People from Morovis, Puerto Rico